Tuskaroria is a genus of sea snails, marine gastropod mollusks in the family Raphitomidae.

Species
Species within the genus Tuskaroria include:
 Tuskaroria ultraabyssalis Sysoev, 1988

References

External links
 Bouchet, P.; Kantor, Y. I.; Sysoev, A.; Puillandre, N. (2011). A new operational classification of the Conoidea (Gastropoda). Journal of Molluscan Studies. 77(3): 273-308

 
Monotypic gastropod genera
Raphitomidae